The A14 is a motorway stretching from the French border at Kortrijk to Antwerp.

References

Motorways in Belgium